The 1919 St. Xavier Musketeers football team was an American football team that represented St. Xavier College (later renamed Xavier University) as an independent during the 1919 college football season. In its second and final season under head coach Albert B. Lambert, the team compiled a 6–2 record and outscored opponents by a total of 260 to 73.

Schedule

References

St. Xavier
Xavier Musketeers football seasons
St. Xavier Saints football